Take One may refer to:

Music
 Take One (Adam Lambert album), 2009
 Take One!, a 1980 album by Shakin' Stevens
 Take One (Susanne Sundfør album), 2008
 Take One (T. S. Monk album), 1992 
 Primera Toma or Take One, an album by La 5ª Estación
 "Take One" (song), by Seo Taiji, 1998
 "Take One", a song by Kodak Black from Dying to Live

Other media
 Take One (British magazine), an online film magazine
 Take One (Canadian magazine), a defunct film magazine
 Take One, a 2014 Indian film directed by Mainak Bhaumik
 Take 1 (TV series), a 2022 Netflix docuseries music reality show

See also
 Take Two (disambiguation)